Perungavoor, is a suburb located North of Chennai, a metropolitan city in Tamil Nadu, India.

Location
Perungavoor is located in between Madhavaram, Red Hills, Minjur and Gnayiru in North of Chennai. The arterial road in Perungavoor is Madhavaram - Arumandai Road.

Chennai Metropolitan Development Authority (CMDA) Proposed Rights Of Way And Set Back Lines For Major Network Of Roads And Announced The Second Master Plan For Chennai Metropolitan Area 

Stretching Vichoor – Vilangadupakkam Road From Nayar – Vichoor Road To Vadaperumbakkam - Perungavur Road Right Of Way 18.0 M Building Line 3.0 M  

Stretching Vadaperumbakkam – Perungavur – Nayar Road From Madhavaram - Redhills Road To Nayar Junction Right Of Way 18.0 M Building Line 3.0 M  

As Per Chennai Metropolitan Development Authority (CMDA) Annexure Xxvi Perungavur In List Of The Chennai Corporation Division Of Thiruvallur District, Ponneri Taluk In Chennai Metropolitan Area.

Glance The Amenities,

 Nearly 5 Minutes To General Stores, Vandalur To Minjur-400 Feet Outer Ring Road, Clothing Stores, Mobile Stores, Departmental Stores, Bank & Atm, Schools & Colleges.
 Nearly 10 Minutes To Redhills, Manali, Nh-16 Redhills To Thiruvallur Outer Ring Road, Rto Office, Petrol Bunk, Government & Private Hospitals.
 Nearly 15 Minutes To Madhavaram, Madhavaram Metro, Madhavaram Botanical Garden, Madhavaram Taluk Office & Puzhal Block Development Office.
 Nearly 30 Minutes To Koyambedu, Chennai Central, Annanagar, Perambur & Padi Saravana Store.
 Nearly 45 Minutes To Siruvapuri Temple, Marina Beach, Pulicat Beach, Pazhaverkadu Birds Sanctuary & 850 Acres 1000 Crore Industrial Park Project By Mahindra World City And Sumitomo Corporation.

List of Schools Near Perungavur,

 Government Middle School, Infant Jesus Matriculation Higher Secondary School, Jaigopal Garodia Matriculation School, G.R.T Mahalakshmi Vivekananda Vidyalaya Junior College, Redhills Sriram School, Don Bosco Matric Higher Secondary School.

List of Colleges Near Perungavur,

 Redhills RB Gothi Jain College for Women, Puzhal Sri Nallalaghu Nadar Polytechnic College,Tamil Nadu Horticulture Institute, Velammal Engineering College, Tamil Nadu Veterinary and Animal Sciences University, CPCL Polytechnic College, Thiruthangal Nadar Arts College.

List of Companies & Industries Near Perungavur,

 Puzhal NeXgen IT Services Pvt Ltd, Perambur K-Teq Solutions, Annanagar IBM, Anna Nagar East Orbit IT Solutions, Annanagar East Netaxis IT Solutions, TECHVIGOR Software Solutions, Ambattur Info York IT Services, Vichoor Adhitya Containers, Manali New Town RK Steel Manufacturing Company Pvt Ltd, Vichoor Allastir Pvt Ltd, International Steel Processors.

List of Shopping Malls & Multiplexes Near Perungavur,

 Revathi Stores, The Chennai Mobiles, SKLS Galaxy Mall, GRT Jewellers, Jayanth Store, Girnar Polymer, Padi Saravana Store, Sri Ganga Cinemas, Spectrum S2 Cinemas, AGS Cinemas, PVR Cinemas, Lakshmi Theatre, Sri Ambika Theatre, Shree Radha Movie Park.

List of Restaurants Near Perungavur,

 Hotel Jayalakshmi, Jomons BBQ, Friend's Dhaba, Fresh Dhaba, Selvaraj Paya Kada, Ganga Sweets, SS Hyderabad Biryani, A2B Adyar Ananda Bhavan, Divya Chettinad Hotels A/C, Aasife Biriyani & Hotel Poorna Sree.

List of Pharmacy Near Perungavur,

 Apollo Pharmacy, Quality Medicals, Green Pharmacy, Sri VMK Medical, Sri Sanjana Pharmacy, Aassan Siddha & Ayurveda Pharmacy And Clinic & Government Veterinary Pharmacy.

List of Meat Stores Near Perungavur,

 ECO ROOTS Poultry Store, R N Organic Farm And SBK Country Chicken Centre.

List of ATM Near Perungavur,

 Bank of Baroda ATM, Andhra Bank ATM, Indian Overseas ATM, Dena Bank ATM, SBI ATM, Vijaya Bank ATM, Axis Bank ATM, ICICI Bank ATM, Canara Bank ATM & GoCash ATM.

List of Hospitals Near Perungavur,

 Yegova Clinic & Medicals,  Life Care Clinic, St. Teresa Clinic, Vanaja Hospital, Sugam Hospital, St.Anthony's Hospital, KVT Speciality Hospital, Kings Hospital.

List of Parks Near Perungavur,

 Children's Park, Madhavaram Tree Park, Thirupathi Devasthanam Nagar Park, Amma Park, Madhavaram Botanical Garden, Mathur MMDA Park, Corporation Park & PlayGround.

List of Nearby Transportations,

 Madhavaram Satellite Bus Terminus, Madhavaram Bus Terminu, Vichoor Bus Stand, Manali Bus Terminal, Redhills Bus Terminal.

Upcoming Development Projects by CMDA Near Perungavur,

Madhavaram Metro : Madhavaram to Taramani underground stretch on corridor 3 to be taken up first. Chennai Metro plans to begin work on its phase II project, spanning across 118.9 km, by the middle of next year 2022. Phase II comprises three corridors — 

1. Corridor 3 from Madhavaram to SIPCOT

2. Corridor 4 from Lighthouse to Poonamallee

3. Corridor 5 from Madhavaram to Sholinganallur

Of these, the 52-km stretch between Madhavaram and Taramani, a part of corridor 3, will be taken up first. It passes through areas like Purasawalkam, Sterling Road and Mylapore.

References

External links
CMDA Official Webpage

Neighbourhoods in Chennai